Rileah Elizabeth Vanderbilt is an American actress and producer. She is one of the founding members of Team Unicorn.

Career
Vanderbilt's film debut was Hatchet, where she played the Young Victor Crowley. She reprised the role in Hatchet 2 and played Officer Dougherty in Hatchet 3; she also had minor roles in Spiral and Frozen.

With their production company Danger Maiden Productions, Vanderbilt and Clare Grant created, produced, and starred in the short film Saber, which won two awards at the 2009 Star Wars Fan Film Awards. In 2010, the duo worked with Milynn Sarley and Michele Boyd under the group name Team Unicorn to create a series of videos, beginning with G33k & G4m3r Girls, a parody of Katy Perry's California Gurls video, which achieved one million views in its first week. In 2011, she leaked online a racy commercial that she had filmed with Serena Williams for potential use in the Top Spin 4 marketing campaign; 2K Sports had declined to use the commercial and criticized the commercial's release by Vanderbilt as "unauthorized". In 2013, Adult Swim announced that Rileah co-created and will be starring in and executive producing a pilot based on the webseries she co-created, Team Unicorn. She appeared also as herself, along with Ray Wise, Kane Hodder, Tom Holland, Mick Garris and Steven Barton in Adam Green's horror mockumentary film Digging Up the Marrow.

Personal life
Vanderbilt first met actor/director Adam Green in 2002 at the Rainbow Bar & Grill and married him on June 26, 2010.

Filmography

Film

Television/Internet

Awards and nominations

References

External links
 
 

21st-century American actresses
Living people
People from Cripple Creek, Colorado
American film actresses
American television actresses
American web series actresses
Actresses from Colorado
Year of birth missing (living people)